The 2011–12 Turkish Airlines Euroleague was the 12th season of the modern era of Euroleague and the second under the title sponsorship of Turkish Airlines. Including the competition's previous incarnation as the FIBA Europe Champions Cup, this was the 55th season of the premier competition for European men's clubs. The Final Four was held at the Sinan Erdem Dome in Istanbul, in 11–13 May 2012. It was won by the Piraeus club Olympiacos (2nd title), who defeated CSKA Moscow in the championship game. It was the 5th final involving a Greek club in the last six seasons, and 4th Greek win in that time.

Teams
On 20 June 2011 the teams for this season were announced.

The labels in the parentheses show how each team qualified for the place of its starting round (TH: Euroleague title holders):
A: Qualified through an A–licence
1st, 2nd, etc.: League position after Playoffs
QR: Qualifying rounds
WC: Wild card
EC: Champion of the 2010–11 Eurocup

Draw 
The draws for the 2011–12 Turkish Airlines Euroleague was held on Monday, 4 July. The draws determined the qualifying-round matchups and regular-season groups for the Euroleague, as well as the qualifying rounds for the Eurocup and the regular-season for the EuroChallenge.

Teams were seeded into six pots of four teams in accordance with the Club Ranking, based on their performance in European competitions during a three-year period.

Two teams from the same country cannot coincide in the same Regular Season group, except for Spain that has five teams participating in the competition.

Qualifying rounds

A total number of sixteen teams participated in the qualifying rounds. The qualifying rounds consisted of two final eight knock-out tournaments. The two winning teams advance to the regular season.

Regular season
The regular season began on 19 October 2011. If teams were level on record at the end of the regular season, tiebreakers were applied in the following order:
 Head-to-head record.
 Head-to-head point differential.
 Point differential during the Regular Season.
 Points scored during the regular season.
 Sum of quotients of points scored and points allowed in each Regular Season match.

Group A

Group B

Group C

Group D

Top 16
The draw took place in Barcelona, Spain on 28 December 2011 at 13:00 CET. The sixteen qualified teams were divided into four seeds based on their final standings in the regular season. Teams coming from the same regular season group were kept from coinciding in the same Top 16 group and an effort was made to keep teams from the same country from coinciding as well. Teams from the same city, Anadolu Efes, Fenerbahçe Ülker and Galatasaray Medical Park from Istanbul; Olympiacos and Panathinaikos from Greater Athens, or teams playing in the same arena were prevented from playing both at home in the same matchday.

Group E

Group F

Group G

Group H

Quarterfinals

Team 1 hosted Games 1 and 2, plus Game 5 if necessary. Team 2 hosted Game 3, and Game 4 if necessary.

Final four

Individual statistics

Rating

Points

Rebounds

Assists

Other Stats

Game highs

Awards

Euroleague 2011–12 MVP 
  Andrei Kirilenko (  CSKA Moscow)

Euroleague 2011–12 Final Four MVP 
  Vassilis Spanoulis (  Olympiacos)

All-Euroleague Team 2011–12

Top Scorer (Alphonso Ford Trophy)
  Bo McCalebb (  Montepaschi Siena)

Best Defender
  Andrei Kirilenko (  CSKA Moscow)

Rising Star
  Nikola Mirotić (  Real Madrid)

Coach of the Year (Alexander Gomelsky Award)
  Dusan Ivković (  Olympiacos)

MVP Weekly

Regular season

Top 16

Quarterfinals

MVP of the Month

See also
 FIBA European Champions Cup and EuroLeague history
 Rosters of Top Teams in the European Club Competitions
 EuroLeague Finals
 European Cup and EuroLeague records and statistics
 EuroLeague Final Four
 EuroLeague Awards
 2011–12 Eurocup Basketball

References

External links
 Official website

 
EuroLeague seasons